Ban2oozle is the third studio album by American rapper Jipsta. It was released on 6 January 2017 and debuted at #45 on the iTunes Top 200 chart in the first week of release, making it Jipsta's most successful album to date. "Ban2oozle" was submitted to (and accepted by) The Recording Academy as a potential nominee in the category of Grammy Award for Best Dance/Electronic Album.

The album contains 12 new songs, including the lead single "Ban2oozle". This is the first album that Jipsta has released since taking time off following a hate crime attack in 2014. On Twitter, Jipsta revealed that his voice had changed following the surgery required to his face.

Track listing

References 

2017 albums
Jipsta albums